The Roman Catholic Diocese of Cuenca is a diocese located in the city of Cuenca in the Ecclesiastical province of Toledo in Spain.

History
 July 5, 1183: Established as Diocese of Cuenca

Leadership
Bishops of Cuenca (Roman rite)

Juan Yáñez (1183–1195)
St. Julian of Cuenca (1196 – 1208 Died)
. . . 
Pedro Laurencio  (1262 – 1271 Died)
Gonzalo Pérez Gudiel (1272 – 27 Sep 1275 Appointed, Bishop of Burgos)
. . . 
Gonzalo Diego Palomeque (15 Mar 1289 – 16 Jan 1299 Appointed, Archbishop of Toledo)
. . . 
Fernando Gutiérrez (bishop) (11 Apr 1326 – 1327 Died)
Juan del Campo (bishop) (8 Aug 1327 – 7 May 1328 Appointed, Bishop of Oviedo) 
. . . 
Pedro Gomez Barroso  (4 Mar 1373 – 1378 Appointed, Bishop of Évora)
. . . 
Diego de Anaya Maldonado (1407–1418)
. . . 
Lope de Barrientos, O.P. (7 Apr 1445 – 30 May 1469 Died)
Giacopo Antonio Venier (6 Oct 1469 – 3 Aug 1479 Died) 
Raffaele Sansone Riario (13 Aug 1479 – 8 Jul 1482 Appointed, Administrator of Salamanca) 
Alfonso de Burgos, O.P. (1482 – 1485 Appointed, Bishop of Palencia) 
Alfonso de Fonseca (26 Aug 1485 – 24 May 1493 Appointed, Bishop of Osma)
Raffaele Sansone Riario (24 May 1493 – 9 Jul 1521 Died) 
Diego Ramírez de Fuenleal (1518 – 1537 Died)
Alessandro Cesarini (Sr.) (24 May 1538 – 13 Feb 1542 Died) 
Sebastián Ramírez de Fuenleal (Arellano) (2 Jun 1542 – 22 Jan 1547 Died) 
Miguel Muñoz (bishop) (12 Apr 1547 – 13 Sep 1553 Died)
Pedro Castro Lemos (5 Jun 1555 – 1 Aug 1561 Died) 
Bernardo de Fresneda, O.F.M. (4 May 1562 – 16 Nov 1571 Appointed, Bishop of Córdoba) 
Gaspar de Quiroga y Vela (17 Dec 1571 – 6 Sep 1577 Appointed, Archbishop of Toledo) 
Diego de Covarrubias y Leiva (6 Sep 1577 – 27 Sep 1577 Died) 
Rodrigo de Castro Osorio (de Lemos) (13 Jun 1578 – 20 Oct 1581 Appointed, Archbishop of Sevilla) 
Gómez Zapata (8 Nov 1582 – 1 Feb 1587 Died) 
Juan Fernández Vadillo (7 Aug 1587 – 1 Sep 1595 Died) 
Pedro Portocarrero (bishop) (28 May 1597 – 20 Sep 1600 Died)
Andrés Pacheco (13 Aug 1601 – 1622 Resigned) 
Enrique Pimentel Zúñiga (13 Feb 1623 – 11 Jun 1653 Died) 
Juan Francisco Pacheco (6 Oct 1653 – 24 May 1663 Died) 
Francisco de Zárate y Terán (28 Jan 1664 – 21 Dec 1679 Died)
Alonso Antonio de San Martín (21 Oct 1681 – 5 Jul 1705 Died)
Miguel del Olmo Manrique (22 Mar 1706 – 27 Feb 1721 Died) 
Juan Lancaster (or Alencaster) Norona (16 Jun 1721 – 31 Oct 1733 Died) 
Diego González Toro y Villalobos (5 May 1734 – 13 Sep 1737 Died) 
José Flores Osorio (3 Mar 1738 – 26 Nov 1759 Died) 
Isidro Carvajal Lancaster (21 Jul 1760 – 15 Jan 1771 Died) 
Sebastián Flóres Pabón (29 Jul 1771 – 25 Jul 1777 Died) 
Felipe Antonio Solano Marín (1 Mar 1779 – 10 May 1800 Died) 
Antonio Palafox y Croy de Abre (20 Oct 1800 – 9 Dec 1802 Died) 
Ramón Falcón y Salcedo (28 Mar 1803 – 20 Nov 1826 Died) 
Jacinto Rodríguez Rico (21 May 1827 – 12 Jan 1841 Died) 
Juan Gilberto Ruiz Capucín y Feijó (17 Dec 1847  – 9 Oct 1848 Died) 
Fermín Sánchez Artesoro, O.F.M. Cap. (2 Apr 1849 – 4 Dec 1855 Died) 
Miguel Payá y Rico (25 Jun 1858 – 16 Jan 1874 Appointed, Archbishop of Santiago de Compostela) 
Sebastián Herrero y Espinosa de los Monteros, C.O. (17 September 1875 – 18 December 1876 Confirmed, Bishop of Vitoria) 
José Moreno y Mazón (20 Mar 1877 – 18 Nov 1881 Appointed, Patriarch of the West Indies) 
Juan María Valero y Nacarino (27 Mar 1882 – 16 Nov 1890 Died) 
Pelayo González y Conde (1 Jun 1891 – 18 Nov 1899 Died) 
Wenceslao Sangüesa y Guía (19 Apr 1900  – 1921 Retired) 
Cruz Laplana y Laguna (30 Nov 1921 Appointed – 7 Aug 1936 Died)
Inocencio Rodríguez Díez (10 Jun 1943 – 13 Apr 1973 Retired) 
José Guerra Campos (13 Apr 1973 – 26 Jun 1996 Retired) 
Ramón del Hoyo López (26 Jun 1996 – 19 May 2005 Appointed, Bishop of Jaén) 
José María Yanguas Sanz (23 Dec 2005 – )

Auxiliary bishops
García de Sahagún, O. de M. (11 Mar 1501 –)
García Gil Manrique (5 Mar 1618 – 30 Aug 1627)
Rodrigo Cruzado Caballero (8 Jan 1652 – ?)
Juan de Las Peñas (30 Aug 1723 – 10 Jul 1726)
Pedro del Cañizo Losa y Valera (11 Sep 1726 – ?)

See also
Roman Catholicism in Spain
Cuenca Cathedral

References

Sources
 Catholic Hierarchy 

Roman Catholic dioceses in Spain
Religious organizations established in the 1180s
 
Roman Catholic dioceses established in the 12th century